John King Cheyney (April 1, 1858 – March 19, 1939) was a Sponge Company & Sponge Exchange founder, a local politician and a sponge industry promoter in Tarpon Springs, Florida. A memorial on Dodecanese Boulevard
commemorates his life. He is listed as a Great Floridian.

Biography
He was born in Philadelphia. He died in Tarpon Springs, Florida.

Legacy
The John K. Cheney House (1890) at 30 West Tarpon was home for the Philadelphia banker who financed establishment of the sponge industry in Tarpon Springs, bringing Greeks from the Dodecanese Islands. His efforts as a land developer seeking establish Tarpon as a sponging center failed for nine years until the Spanish–American War caused boats from Key West to shelter in the area. In 1896 the first Greek, John Cocoris, arrived and he brought his brothers in 1901.

References

1858 births
1939 deaths
Sponge diving
American company founders
Businesspeople from Philadelphia
19th-century American businesspeople
20th-century American businesspeople
Tarpon Springs, Florida
Businesspeople from Florida